The Comprehensive Convention on International Terrorism (CCIT) is a proposed treaty which intends to criminalize all forms of international terrorism and deny terrorists, their financiers and supporters access to funds, arms, and safe havens.

The convention has been under negotiation by the United Nations General Assembly's Ad Hoc Committee established by Resolution 51/210 of 17 December 1996 on Terrorism and the United Nations General Assembly Sixth Committee (Legal), but  consensus has not yet been reached for the adoption of the convention.

Early progress
India proposed this convention in 1996.  The UN General Assembly's Ad Hoc Committee established by Resolution 51/210 of 17 December 1996 on Terrorism and the General Assembly Sixth Committee (Legal) have been undertaking negotiations since 1997.  

Although consensus has not yet been reached for the wording of the comprehensive terrorism convention, discussions have yielded three separate protocols that aim to tackle terrorism: International Convention for the Suppression of Terrorist Bombings, adopted on 15 December 1997; International Convention for the Suppression of the Financing of Terrorism, adopted on 9 December 1999; and International Convention for the Suppression of Acts of Nuclear Terrorism, adopted on 13 April 2005.

Deadlock
The negotiations of the Comprehensive Terrorism Convention are deadlocked because of differences over the definition of terrorism. Thalif Deen described the situation as follows: "The key sticking points in the draft treaty revolve around several controversial yet basic issues, including the definition of 'terrorism'. For example, what distinguishes a "terrorist organisation" from a 'liberation movement'? And do you exclude activities of national armed forces, even if they are perceived to commit acts of terrorism? If not, how much of this constitutes 'state terrorism'?"

India has been pushing for the treaty consistently, particularly in the wake of the 2008 Mumbai attacks. The Indian Prime Minister, Narendra Modi, once again raised the topic in his address at the 69th Session of the UN General Assembly held in September 2014, and India’s permanent representative at the GA, Syed Akbaruddin, further pressed for the adoption of CCIT following the July 2016 Dhaka attack.

Proposed definition of terrorism

Being a criminal law instrument, the definition of terrorism to be included in the proposed Convention must have, in the words of coordinator of negotiations Carlos Diaz-Paniagua, the necessary "legal precision, certainty, and fair-labeling of the criminal conduct – all which emanate from the basic human rights obligation to observe due process".

The definition of the crime of terrorism which has been on the negotiating table of the Comprehensive Convention since 2002 reads as follows:

2002 proposed amendments

This definition is not controversial in itself; the deadlock in the negotiations arises instead from the opposing views on whether such a definition would be applicable to the armed forces of a state and to self-determination movements.

The coordinator of the negotiations, supported by most western delegations, proposed the following exceptions to address those issues:

The state members of the Organisation of the Islamic Conference proposed instead the following exceptions:

Recent meetings
At the first meeting of the 73rd General Assembly session of the Sixth Committee in October 2018, speakers from around the world reported that the failure to agree on the comprehensive convention had hindered efforts to combat terrorism. All supported efforts to conclude the process as quickly as possible, with some raising concern about specific issues, such as conflating terrorism with the legitimate aspirations for self-determination.

See also

International conventions on terrorism

References

Terrorism
Proposed treaties
Terrorism treaties